Shooters Island is a  uninhabited island at the southern end of Newark Bay, off the North Shore of Staten Island in New York City. The boundary between the states of New York and New Jersey runs through the island, with a small portion on the north end of the island belonging to the cities of Bayonne and Elizabeth in New Jersey and the rest being part of the borough of Staten Island in New York City.

Early history

In colonial times Shooters Island was used as a hunting preserve.  During the Revolutionary War, George Washington used the island as a drop-off point for messages, and the place became a haven for spies.

Shipyard

The first shipyard on Shooters Island was created in 1860 by David Decker. From 1898 until 1910, the island was home to a major shipyard, the Townsend-Downey Shipbuilding Company. Theodore E. Ferris, who later designed the eponymous ships used by the American government in World War I, was an employee of the firm. Around this time it was also home to the Standard Shipbuilding Company, which bought the island in 1915. The entire island was occupied by buildings, including a foundry, pattern shop, and offices. There were major docks and shipways that faced to the east. Contrary to a previous report, President Theodore Roosevelt did not go hunting on this industrial island.

The Townsend-Downey Company built a yacht, for Kaiser Wilhelm II of Germany. Its launch in February 1902 was attended by many hundreds of spectators, including Pres. Theodore Roosevelt and Prince Henry of Prussia. Alice Roosevelt, the president's daughter, christened the boat. Thomas Alva Edison sent a cameraman who made one of the first news movies of the event. It is available online from the Library of Congress. The next day a reception was held at the White House for Mr. Downey and representatives of the German Government.

The following year the fast three-masted schooner  was launched at the yard. In 1905, it raced across the Atlantic and won the Kaiser's cup and set a record for the crossing under sail which stood unbroken for almost 90 years. The brigantine yacht was named after industrialist and philanthropist Andrew Carnegie, who was a friend of Mr. Downey. It was built entirely of wood and nonmagnetic metals so as not to interfere with magnetic measurements.

The island came under the control of the Tidewater Oil Company in 1903. In 1905, the eight building plant and its 33 acres were purchased by the Colonial Trust Company for $516,000. At the time, the shipyard was valued at two million dollars.

The island was used for industrial and shipbuilding operations through 1922.  Abandoned vessels began to accumulate around the perimeter of the island by 1930.

Bird sanctuary

Neglected during much of the later 20th century, the island has been made an official bird sanctuary, partially to discourage the United States Army Corps of Engineers who wanted to blow up the island to ease navigation by vessels coming down from Port Newark. It has begun to disintegrate into Newark Bay. The island and decayed remnants of old piers are visible to users of the Bayonne Bridge between Staten Island and Bayonne, New Jersey. The remains of the once active shipyard are still present, but diminishing every year.

Shooters Island began to support nesting wading birds, cormorants and gulls in the early 1970s.  At its peak in 1995, the island supported 400 nesting pairs of herons, egrets, ibis and 121 nesting pairs of double-crested cormorants.  The island is now owned by the City of New York and is maintained by New York City Department of Parks and Recreation as a bird sanctuary.

See also

 Geography of New York Harbor

References

External links

NYC Audubon Harbor Herons Project
Harbor Herons Nesting Survey, recent reports on wading bird, cormorant, and gull nesting activity at and around Shooters Island
History of Shooters Island

Landforms of Hudson County, New Jersey
Landforms of Union County, New Jersey
Historic American Engineering Record in New York (state)
Uninhabited islands of New Jersey
Islands of New York City
Borders of New Jersey
Borders of New York (state)
Islands of Staten Island
Protected areas of Staten Island
Nature reserves in New York (state)
Nature reserves in New Jersey
Coastal islands of New Jersey